Handlin is a surname. Notable people with the surname include:

 Amy Handlin (born 1956), American politician
 David P. Handlin, American architect and architectural historian
 Denis Handlin (born 1951), Australian entrepreneur and business executive
 Oscar Handlin (1915–2011), American historian
 William Handlin (1885–1953), American football coach

See also
Meanings of minor planet names: 22001–23000#939